Willy Wonka is a character from the 1964 Roald Dahl novel Charlie and the Chocolate Factory and it sequel Charlie and the Great Glass Elevator

Willy Wonka may also refer to:
 Willy Wonka & the Chocolate Factory, the 1971 film adaptation of Dahl's novel
 Roald Dahl's Willy Wonka (musical), a 2004 stage musical based on the first novel and first film.
 Charlie and the Chocolate Factory (franchise), also called the Willy Wonka franchise
 The Willy Wonka Candy Company, a British candy brand based on the fictional company from Dahl's novel

See also 
 Charlie and the Chocolate Factory (disambiguation)
 Wonka (disambiguation)